The Molde panorama is the renowned panoramic view of some 222 partly snow-clad peaks, seen from the town of Molde in Molde Municipality in Møre og Romsdal county, Norway.

The panorama has been a major tourist attraction for over 150 years.

References

External links
View the Molde Panorama

Molde
Tourist attractions in Møre og Romsdal